Puvirnituq is a northern village (Inuit community) in Nunavik, on the Povungnituk River near its mouth on Hudson Bay in northern Quebec, Canada. Its population was 2,129 as of the 2021 Canadian census.

Of all other northern villages in Nunavik (VN), only Ivujivik and Puvirnituq have no Inuit reserved land (TI) of the same name associated with it.

The name means "putrifed ". The name is said to have arisen after an epidemic killed off most of the area's residents to the point where there were not enough people to bury the dead, allowing the exposed bodies to decompose, giving off a putrid smell.

Puvirnituq is the aviation hub of the Hudson Bay coast. Puvirnituq Airport handles scheduled flights to and from all other Hudson Bay coastal communities in Quebec, Montreal, and Ottawa. It is not accessible by road.

The police services in Puvirnituq are provided by the Nunavik Police Service.

History

In 1921, the Hudson's Bay Company (HBC) established a trading post in the village, known as Povungnituk and often shortened to Pov. This attracted the settlement of Inuit living in the region. In 1951, the HBC opened a general store. The closure of HBC stores in other nearby villages led to an influx of Inuit to Puvirnituq.

A Catholic mission was founded in 1956, which encouraged the residents to form the Carvers Association of Povungnituk two years later. It later became the Co-operative Association of Povungnituk and was instrumental in assisting, developing, and marketing Inuit art. Its success inspired other Inuit communities to form similar cooperatives, most of which now make up the Federation of Co-operatives of Northern Quebec. Leah Nuvalinga Qumaluk was among the artists who worked at the cooperative.

Demographics 

Education
The Kativik School Board operates three schools in Puvirnituq. Ikaarvik Primary School for K-3, Iguarsivik Primary-Secondary School for grades 4 through Secondary 5, and the Adult Education Centre.

Notable people 
Inuit throat singer and activist Shina Novalinga (born 1998), an Inuk social media personality gained fame for posting videos throat singing with her mother on TikTok and Instagram. As of August 2022, she has over 4 million TikTok followers and over 2 million Instagram followers. Other people from Puvirnituq include Mary Pudlat (1923–2001), a visual artist.

Gallery

References

External links

Nunavik Tourism, Puvirnituq website
Watch My Village in Nunavik, a documentary about life in the community

Inuit communities in Quebec
Hudson's Bay Company trading posts
Populated places on Hudson Bay
Road-inaccessible communities of Quebec